Saint Iuventius (or Iuvence) was a bishop of Pavia during the 1st century. Together with Syrus of Pavia he was sent there by Saint Hermagoras. Both Iuventius and Syrus are reported to have been the first bishop of Pavia.

Iuventius has two feast days, 8 February alone and 12 September together with Syrus.

External links
8 february and 12 september at Dominican Martyrology

1st-century Italian bishops
Bishops of Pavia
1st-century Christian saints